The Ivory Coast national badminton team represents Ivory Coast in international team competitions. It is controlled by the Ivory Coast Badminton Federation, the governing body for Ivorian badminton. The national team trains at the national badminton federation's headquarters in Abidjan.

The Ivorian men's team debuted in the 2018 All Africa Men's and Women's Team Badminton Championships. The mixed team made its first appearance in team tournaments at the 2019 African Badminton Championships.

Participation in BCA competitions 

Men's team

Mixed team

Current squad 

Male players
Akpa Jerome Ibrahim Agnimel
Franck Ahi
Ousmane Ouedraogo
Alex Patrick Zolobe

Female players
Esme Osseane Davila Loess
Aicha Laurene N'Dia
Liho Hortense Vanessa Gaelle Anibie
Lou Gohi Theophile Annick Doulou
Naffissatou Abolaye Kamilu
Yebre Marie Loris Gnagne

References 

Badminton
National badminton teams
Badminton in Ivory Coast